Annavaram is a village in Pedanandipadu mandal in Guntur district of Andhra Pradesh, India.

References

Villages in Guntur district